Garray is a municipality located in the province of Soria, Castile and León, Spain.

History 
The archaeological site of Numantia is within the boundaries of Garray. It is famous for its role in the Celtiberian Wars.

References
2.    Garray#cite ref-2 Municipal Register of Spain 2022.  Instituto Nacional de Estadística (Spain)

Municipalities in the Province of Soria